Elizabeth Hinton (born June 26, 1983) is an American historian. She is Associate Professor of History and African American Studies at Yale University and Professor of Law at Yale Law School. Her research focuses on the persistence of poverty and racial inequality in the twentieth-century United States. Hinton was elected to the American Philosophical Society in 2022.

Life 
Born in Ann Arbor, Michigan to Alfred Hinton, an art professor and  Ann Pearlman, a therapist. Her father's family moved north to Michigan as part of the Great Migration to become autoworkers. Hinton completed a Ph.D. in United States History at Columbia University in 2013. She was a Postdoctoral Scholar in the Michigan Society of Fellows and Assistant Professor in the Department of Afroamerican and African Studies at the University of Michigan. Hinton divorced her first husband in 2017. She is remarried and lives in New Haven with her current husband and their two children.

She has contributed articles and op-ed pieces to periodicals including The Journal of American History, the Journal of Urban History, The New York Times, and the Los Angeles Times.

Hinton's 2016 book From the War on Poverty to the War on Crime examines the history and modern-day issues in regard to the intertwined relationship between crime and poverty. She argues that this relationship goes farther back than one would think, such as anti-delinquency acts, the "War on Poverty" and "War on Crime" in the Johnson administration, and the Juvenile Justice and Delinquency Prevention Act of 1974.

Hinton served as PhD advisor for poet and scholar Jackie Wang.

Works 
 America on Fire: The Untold History of Police Violence and Black Rebellion Since the 1960s, New York: Liveright, 2021. 
 From the War on Poverty to the War on Crime: The Making of Mass Incarceration in America, Cambridge, Massachusetts: Harvard University Press, 2016. , 
 Co-edited with Manning Marable, The New Black History: Revisiting the Second Reconstruction, New York: Palgrave Macmillan, 2011.

References

External links 
 Official website at Yale Law School
 Interview with Elizabeth Hinton, July 30, 2016, African American Intellectual History Society
 

1983 births
Living people
21st-century American historians
Harvard University faculty
Columbia Graduate School of Arts and Sciences alumni
African-American historians
People from Ann Arbor, Michigan
Historians from Michigan
21st-century African-American writers
20th-century African-American people
Members of the American Philosophical Society